Vandersloot Music Publishing Company was an American publisher of marches, waltzes, rags, religious music, and popular music of the Tin Pan Alley genre.  The firm was founded in 1899 by Frederick William Vandersloot, Jr. (1866–1931) and his brother, Caird Melvill Vandersloot (born 1869).  F. W. Vandersloot was a gospel singer, composer, and choir director.  In 1913, the firm was based at 233 West 3rd Street, Williamsport, Pennsylvania with an office in New York at 41 W 18th Street, an area ten blocks directly south of what then became known as Tin Pan Alley.

For many years, Harry James Lincoln served as the composer and general manager of Vandersloot Music.  Cora E. Vandersloot,  Elwert (1869–1944), wife of F. W. Vandersloot, had also served as president and manager.  In 1929, Harry J. Lincoln acquired part of the Vandersloot Music Publishing Company and moved it to Philadelphia and operated it under the same name.  When F. W. Vandersloot died in 1931, the firm dissolved, with much of the inventory being acquired by New York publisher Jack Mills.

Frank Hoyt Losey had been a composer and editor-in-chief for the Vandersloot Music Publishing Company.

Vandersloot composers and lyricists 

 Carl Donaldson Vandersloot
 Charles Cohen (1878–1931), rag composer
 Robert Nathaniel Dett
 Charles E. Duble, circus band composer
 Raymond B. Egan, lyricist
 Stephen Foster
 Joseph E. Howard, lyricist
 Harry J. Lincoln (pseudonyms: Abe Losch, Carl Loveland, & Harry Jay)
 Frank Hoyt Losey
 Raymond A. Sherwood, lyricist
 Andrew B. Sterling, lyricist
 Charley Straight, jazz pianist

Family 
Frederick William Vandersloot, Jr., married Cora E. Vandersloot ( Elwert) on January 20, 1898.  They had two sons and two daughters.  One son and one daughter — Carl Donaldson Vandersloot (1898–1963) and Ruth Person Vandersloot (1904–1989) — both composed for Vandersloot Music.  In 1920, Ruth married Author Taylor Eaker and composed under the pseudonym Ruth V. Hoyt, her surname borrowed from Vandersloot's editor-in-chief Frank Hoyt Losey.

External links 
 Frederick W. Vandersloot history, researched by Susan Attalla (born 1948) with assistance by the Lycoming County Historical Society.

References 

Vandersloot
Publishing companies established in 1899
1899 establishments in Pennsylvania
American companies established in 1899